Gustaitis is a Lithuanian surname. Notable people with the surname include:

Abby Gustaitis (born 1991), American rugby union player
Antanas Gustaitis (1898–1941), Lithuanian aviator
Motiejus Gustaitis (1870–1927), Lithuanian poet

Lithuanian-language surnames